South of Panama is a 1928 American silent drama film directed by Charles J. Hunt and starring Carmelita Geraghty, Edward Raquello, and Lewis Sargent.

Cast
 Carmelita Geraghty as Carmelita Laredon  
 Edward Raquello as Emilio Cervantes  
 Lewis Sargent as Dick Lewis  
 Philo McCullough as 'Ace' Carney  
 Marie Messinger as Patsy  
 Henry Arras as 'Red' Hearn  
 Carlton S. King as Presidente Laredon  
 Joseph Burke as Garcia  
 Fred Walton as Captain of the Guard

References

Bibliography
 Darby, William. Masters of Lens and Light: A Checklist of Major Cinematographers and Their Feature Films. Scarecrow Press, 1991

External links
 

1928 films
1928 drama films
1920s English-language films
American silent feature films
Silent American drama films
American black-and-white films
Chesterfield Pictures films
Films directed by Charles J. Hunt
1920s American films